Mathilde Frachon is a French fashion model.

Early life 
Mathilde was born in Paris on 16 February 1992. She got scouted in the street of Paris, and started modeling. 
Right after, models.com named Mathilde "Model of the Week".

Career 
She debuted at the fall Charlotte Ronson show in New York, and also walked for 3.1 Phillip Lim, DKNY, and Jill Stuart.
She opened the fall Ossie Clark show in London, and also walked for Dolce & Gabbana, Moschino Cheap & Chic, Giambattista Valli, Karl Lagerfeld, and Kenzo in Milan and Paris.
The following fashion week, she also walked for numerous brands including Proenza Schouler, Marc Jacobs, Armani, Sonia Rykiel, Kenzo, Karl Lagerfeld and Elie Saab.

She appeared in her first Teen Vogue editorial photographed by Lachlan Bailey and shortly after in her first French Vogue editorial photographed by Victor Demarchelier.
She has shot for numerous prestigious magazines and covers such as Vogue Spain, Vogue Japan, Vogue Taiwan, Elle USA, Elle China, Marie Claire France and UK, Interview, Harper's Bazaar China, Nylon, French Revues Des Modes.
She works for brands such as Victoria's Secret Bloomingdale's, Saks Fifth Avenue, Free People, Gap Inc., Cerruti, and DKNY.

Personal life 
Mathilde's hobbies include extreme sports, music, art and fashion. 
She loves doing pilates and cardio to stay in shape.

See also
 .
 "Mathilde Frachon @ Next : “I always been passionate by fashion”". All About Models. Retrieved February 4, 2016.

References

External links 
 Mathilde Frachon's IMG Models Portfolio
 Mode: Mathilde Frachon, la séduisante French touch de Victoria’s Secret
 Oh My Mag article

1992 births
Living people
French female models